Klimkówka may refer to the following places:
Klimkówka, Gorlice County in Lesser Poland Voivodeship (south Poland)
Klimkówka, Nowy Sącz County in Lesser Poland Voivodeship (south Poland)
Klimkówka, Subcarpathian Voivodeship (south-east Poland)